Hello Darling is a 2010 Bollywood comedy film.

Hello Darling may also refer to:
Hello Darling (1975 film), a 1975 Indian Malayalam film
Hello Darling (play), a 2017 comedy drama play by Mir Muneer
"Hello Darlin'" (song), a 1970 song by Conway Twitty
Allo Darlin', a British indie pop band

See also
Hello Darlin' (disambiguation)